Franklin William Vicente (born 12 June 1989 in São Paulo) is a Brazilian footballer who plays as a striker. Vicente played for a number of Brazilian football clubs before coming to Slovenia. In 2010, he signed for Gorica. He made 45 appearances and scored 7 goals in the Slovenian PrvaLiga. In 2012, he signed for Olimpija.

References

External links
PrvaLiga profile 

1989 births
Living people
Brazilian footballers
Association football forwards
Brazilian expatriate footballers
Expatriate footballers in Slovenia
Slovenian PrvaLiga players
Brazilian expatriate sportspeople in Slovenia
ND Gorica players
NK Olimpija Ljubljana (2005) players
NK Celje players
Footballers from São Paulo